Marco Zanuso (14 May 1916 – 11 July 2001) was a leading Italian Modernist architect and designer.

Early life

Marco Zanuso was born in Milan (Italy) 14 May 1916. He was one of a group of Italian designers from Milan shaping the international idea of "good design" in the postwar years. He began his studies in architecture at the Politecnico di Milano university in 1934 and graduated in 1939. During the Second World War he served for the Axis in the Italian Navy, following which he opened his own design office in 1945. From the beginning of his career, at Domus where he served as the editor from 1947–49 and at Casabella where he was editor from 1952–56, where together which his close collaboration with Ernesto Nathan Rogers and others, he helped to establish the theories and ideals of the energetic Modern Design movement. As a professor of architecture, design and town planning at the Politecnico di Milano from the late 1940s until the 1980s, and as one of the founding members of the ADI in the 1950s, he also had a distinct influence over the next design generation coming out of Italy.

Career
Marco Zanuso's prolific career spanned over six decades and during this time his interest in rational design to solve problems, allowed him to push boundaries in town planning, architecture and product design. His approach to European "good design" has some distinctions and he said his "inquisitiveness" drove his "constant search for a new discovery". At every scale, his approach to "finding order in complexity" resulted in his openness to technological innovation, materials and aesthetic functionality that enhanced the human experience. 

He collaborated with many of his peers during his lifetime, including historians Argan, Domenico, Pica and Veronesi, critics Zevi and Dorfles and architects Rogers and Ponti. Architecturally his association with Ernesto N. Rogers resulted in his time as editor of Domus and Casabella and his early essays on architecture in which his distinct approach to Modernism is manifested. In 1957 Zanuso partnered with German designer Richard Sapper. One of their first projects was a small, stackable child's chair designed for Kartell in non-reinforced plastic. This piece was light, functional and playful, manufactured in several bright colors and it was among the furniture designs responsible for convincing people that plastic was a viable and appropriate material for the modern home. 

Zanuso and Sapper were hired in 1959 as consultants to Brionvega, an Italian company trying to produce stylish electronics that would, at least outwardly, beat those being made in Japan and Germany. They designed a series of radios and televisions that became enduring icons of an aesthetic known as "techno-functionalism". Their rounded, compact and portable "Doney 14" (1962) was the first completely transistor television. Working with the language of sculptural minimalism they designed the successful folding "Grillo" telephone for Siemens (1966). This was one of the first phones to put the dial and the earpiece on the same unit.

Zanuso was invited as a guest speaker at the Dunhill industrial design lecture series in Australia during 1971. In 1972, Zanuso and Sapper designed a series of dwellings for the "Italy: The New Domestic Landscape" show at the MoMA. Each stacking unit, like ultramodern teepees, unfolded to a living area complete with all the facilities and many of the accessories of a small apartment. Zanuso wrote that they were "designed for all situations that require immediately available, easily transportable living quarters."  As with the rest of their work, the hallmarks of these designs were elegance and imagination.

In 1984, he was awarded the Premio Presidente della Repubblica prize, and the Compasso d’Oro Lifetime Achievement Award in 1994. He received an Honorary Degree in Industrial Design in 1999 from the Politecnico di Milano, where he also lectured from the 1960s to 1980s.

Architecture 
While Zanuso and Sapper pushed boundaries with their innovative industrial design, from his Milan studio Zanuso explored the boundaries of architecture through various novel projects in Italy and around the world, including Argentina, Brazil and South Africa. Designing complex commercial warehouses and offices, public buildings and domestic spaces, with equal ease, he aimed to enhance modern society, responsibly.

His Olivetti factory (1961) in São Paolo and the new Piccolo Teatro (1996) in Milan for example, are respected examples of his commercial architecture. His domestic architecture is being regarded as having contributed towards architectural innovation in an era that revised the role and processes of the Modern Movement. Among these projects are his Casa a Leto di Priolo, Arenzano (1960-1962), in Genoa, Italy, Case di vacanza, Arzachena, (1962-1964) in Sardinia, Casa Press, Coromandel Farm (1969-1975) in Lydenburg, South Africa, Casa nell'isola di Cavallo (1981-1988) in Corsica. His exploration of architecture in response to nature was an ongoing theme as seen in Cimiterio a la Muda, Longarone, (1967-1973) which was a collaborative project with Gianni Avon, Francesco Tentori and with notable Italian landscape architect, Pietro Porcinai.

Industrial Design
The major pieces of his career run a broad spectrum from early experiments in bent metal to luxurious, plush furniture to sleek industrial designs in plastic. The underlying motif throughout each phase of his work is that he was pioneering the use and market accessibility of every different material he worked with. Some of his first work to be shown at all, and certainly to be shown outside of Italy, was at the Low-Cost Furniture competition sponsored by the MoMA in 1948. His design featured a metal frame chair that used a breakthrough method to join the fabric seat to the frame. In 1948 Pirelli opened a new division, Arflex, to design seating with foam rubber upholstery. They commissioned Zanuso to produce their first models. His "Antropus" chair came out in 1949, followed by the "Lady" chair, which won first prize at the 1951 Milan Triennale. Zanuso lauded the new material, "One could revolutionize not only the system of upholstery but also the structural manufacturing and formal potential...our prototypes acquired visually exciting and new contours...with industrial standards that were previously unimaginable."

Different items of his work in the collections of the Museum of Modern Art in New York City, Triennale Milano, Triennale Tokyo, Vitra Museum, Arflex Museum and Kartell Museum.

Significant products

 1951 "Lady" armchair for arflex (Medaglia d'Oro Triennale)
 1952 "Martingala" armchair for arflex
 1952 "Tripoltrona" sofa for arflex (Medaglia d'Oro Triennale)
 1954 "Sleep-o-matic" sofa for arflex (Medaglia d'Oro Triennale)
 1955 Olivetti buildings in Buenos Aires and San Paolo
 1962 "Doney" television for Brionvega (with Richard Sapper)
 1963 Alfa Romeo 2600 concept (with Richard Sapper)
 1964 "Algol" television for Brionvega (with Richard Sapper)
 1964 "Woodline" and "Fourline" armchairs for arflex
 1964 "K 4999" children's chair for Kartell (with Richard Sapper)
 1965 "TS 502" radio for Brionvega (with Richard Sapper)
 1966 "Grillo" telephone for Siemens (with Richard Sapper) 
 1969 "Black" television for Brionvega (with Richard Sapper) 
 1970 "Marcuso" table for Zanotta
 1970 "Hastil" pen for Aurora (with Richard Sapper) 
 1974 IBM building in Milan
 1998 New theatre Piccolo Teatro in Milan

Publications
 François Burkhardt, Marco Zanuso. Design, Federico Motta Editore, 1994, 
 Aldo Colonnetti Grafica e Design a Milan 1933–2000, Editore Collana AIM – Abitare Segesta Cataloghi, Milan 2001.
 Crespi, L, et al., Marco Zanuso: architettura e design, Rome:Officina Libraria, 2020.
 De Giorgi, M, “Casa Press/Press House Marco Zanuso”, Inventario, vol. 1, 2011, pp. 156–159.
 De Giorgi, M, Marco Zanuso architetto, Milan: Skira, 1999.
 Peres, E & Zamboni, A, Marco Zanuso in South Africa. London: Artifice Press, 2022
 Grignolo R, Marco Zanuso: Scritti sulle tecniche di produzione e di progretto, Milan: Mendrisio Academy Press and Silvana Editoriale (Collection directed by Letizia Tedeschi), 2013.

External links
 Arflex-design, Official website
 Marco Zanuso, Design Dictionary
 Marco Zanuso, Brionvega
 Marco Zanuso, Museum of Modern Art (MoMA)

References 

1916 births
2001 deaths
Polytechnic University of Milan alumni
20th-century Italian architects
Italian industrial designers
Academic staff of the Polytechnic University of Milan
Olivetti people
Architects from Milan
Product designers
Industrial designers
Furniture designers
Designers
Compasso d'Oro Award recipients